Ausfilm is an Australian government-industry partnership that acts as a national content attraction organisation. Ausfilm connects the international film community with Australia's screen incentives, talent and facilities and is composed of about 40 private-sector screen production service companies, as well as the federal Department of Infrastructure, Transport, Regional Development and Communications. It is headquartered at Fox Studios Australia in Sydney and also maintains an office in Los Angeles.

History
Ausfilm was established in 1994 as the Export Film Services Association after Austrade recognized potential opportunities for the country in the American market; it was converted to an incorporated association in 1998.

Functions
Ausfilm markets Australia's incentives, locations and capabilities in production and post/digital/VFX (PDV) to attract international content to produce and/or conduct business in Australia, benefiting the Australian economy and film, television and arts industries.

Ausfilm develops and executes annual campaigns to the global screen market to promote Australia as a production destination, its film-making capabilities and Ausfilm members’ services and work.

Ausfilm's incentives are tax-based and provide a cash rebate to the producer on Qualifying Australian Production Expenditure. The federal government incentives (Producer Offset, Location Offset, PDV Offset) are mutually exclusive, however can be combined with state government incentives & funding.

References

External links
 Official website

Film organisations in Australia